Podhájska is a village and municipality in the Nové Zámky District in the Nitra Region of south-west Slovakia.

History
In historical records the village was first mentioned in 1075.

Geography
The municipality lies at an altitude of 141 metres and covers an area of 11.116 km2. It has a population of about 1156 people.

Climate
The Köppen Climate Classification subtype for this climate is "Dfb" (Warm Summer Continental Climate).

Ethnicity
The population is about 99% Slovak.

Facilities
The village has a small public library a swimming pool and a football pitch.

References

External links
 
 
 Podhájska Thermal Spa
http://www.statistics.sk/mosmis/eng/run.html
Podhájska – Nové Zámky Okolie
Podhájska Thermal Spa

Villages and municipalities in Nové Zámky District